Il figlio della sepolta viva is a 1974 Italian drama film directed by Luciano Ercoli. Based on the novel with the same name written by Carolina Invernizio, it is part of the Invernizio's revival occurred in the early 1970s. In this adaptation Ercoli emphasized the gothic horror elements of the melodramatic plot.

Plot

Cast 
 Fred Robsahm: François
 Eva Czemerys: Giovanna de Cambise 
 Pier Maria Rossi: L'Italiano  
 Gianni Cavina:  Dany 
 Gabriella Lepori: Elisabetta
 Piero Lulli:  Amadeus

References

External links

1974 films
Italian drama films
Films directed by Luciano Ercoli
Films based on Italian novels
Films scored by Franco Micalizzi
1974 drama films
1970s Italian films